The 1987–88 Cornell Big Red men's basketball team represented Cornell University during the 1987–88 college men's basketball season. This was coach Mike Dement's second season at Cornell. The team finished with a final record of 17–10 (11—3 Ivy League) and they won the Ivy League to receive the conference's automatic bid to the NCAA tournament. Playing as the No. 16 seed in the West region, the Big Red were beaten by No. 1 seed and eventual Final Four participant Arizona, 90–50.

Roster

Schedule and results

|-
!colspan=9 style=| Regular Season

|-
!colspan=9 style=| 1988 NCAA tournament

References 

Cornell
Cornell
Cornell Big Red men's basketball seasons
Cornell
Cornell